{{Speciesbox
| image =
| genus = Elachista
| species = minusculella
| authority = Traugott-Olsen, 1992<ref>{{cite web|url=http://www.faunaeur.org/full_results.php?id=435382|archive-url=https://web.archive.org/web/20121015183543/http://www.faunaeur.org/full_results.php?id=435382|url-status=dead|archive-date=October 15, 2012|title=Elachista (Aphelosetia) minusculella Traugott-Olsen 1992|publisher=Fauna Europaea|version=2.6.2|date=August 29, 2013|access-date=November 9, 2013}}</ref>
}}Elachista minusculella'' is a moth of the family Elachistidae. It is found in Turkey.

References

minusculella
Moths described in 1992
Endemic fauna of Turkey
Moths of Asia